"Shanghai Shuffle" is a jazz standard composed by Larry Conley and Gene Rodemich and recorded in 1924 by Fletcher Henderson featuring Louis Armstrong. It is in the key of F major and is evidently influenced by "Limehouse Blues". The signature clarinet sound has an eastern quality to it; Jeffrey Magee calls it an attempt to "reinforce the exotic jazz-Chinese connection".

References

External links

1920s jazz standards
1924 songs
Jazz compositions in F major
Dixieland jazz standards